Magdalena Gryka (born 28 May 1994 in Bialystok) is a German volleyball player.

Career 
She played with Impel Wrocław, at the 2015–16 CEV Women's Champions League. 
She participated in the 2018 FIVB Volleyball Women's Nations League.

References

External links 
 FIVB profile
 CEV profile
 http://www.fivb.org/EN/volleyball/competitions/Youth/Women/2011/PhotoGallery.asp?Tourn=GY2011&No=59
 https://volleymob.com/pol-kzso-ostrowiec-signs-magdalena-gryka-rabkas-departure/

1994 births
Living people
German women's volleyball players
Sportspeople from Białystok
German people of Polish descent